Get That Paper may refer to:
 Get That Paper (Do or Die album), 2006
 Get That Paper (Daz Dillinger and Fratthouse album), 2009